Arlen Herbert Siegfreid (August 23, 1946 - April 11, 2020) was a Republican member of the Kansas House of Representatives, representing the 15th district from 2003 to 2013 and the 121st district briefly from 2013 until his resignation a few months later.

Issue positions
Siegfreid's website lists his legislative goals as "Quality Education, Economic Development, Control of Government Growth & Taxes, Public Safety & Security, and Family Values."

Committee membership
 Interstate Cooperation (Chair)
 Taxation
 Education Budget
 Calendar and Printing
 Legislative Budget.

Major donors
The top 5 donors to Siegfreid's 2008 campaign:
1. Kansas Bankers Assoc 	$1,000 	
2. Koch Industries 	$1,000
3. Kansas Medical Society 	$1,000 	
4. Embarq 	$1,000
5. Kansas Republican Party 	$1,000

References

External links

 Official Website
 Kansas Legislature - Arlen Siegfreid
 Project Vote Smart profile
 Kansas Votes profile
 State Surge - Legislative and voting track record
 Follow the Money campaign contributions:
 2006, 2008

1946 births
2020 deaths
Republican Party members of the Kansas House of Representatives
21st-century American politicians
People from Newton, Kansas